José Daniel Alarcón Goyo (born 12 May 2005) is a Venezuelan footballer who plays as a forward for Estudiantes de Mérida.

Career statistics

Club

Notes

References

2005 births
Living people
People from Mérida (state)
Venezuelan footballers
Association football forwards
Venezuelan Primera División players